The Suncorp Super Netball Grand Final Most Valuable Player (MVP) is an annual Suncorp Super Netball award in Australia.

It is given to the best player of the Grand Final. In 2017, Karla Mostert (now Karla Pretorius) won the inaugural award.

Winners

References

MVP